Dicken Schrader (born December 4, 1973) is a Colombian-American creative director, director, video artist and musician. He is most noted for his YouTube viral videos featuring himself and his two children, Milah and Korben, performing cover versions of Depeche Mode songs using an old keyboard and various toys and household items as instruments, under the name DMK. Schrader and his children are featured in the film Spirits in the Forest, directed by Anton Corbijn.

Early life 
Schrader was born in Bogotá, Colombia. He is the son of María Eugenia Forero and Christian Schrader, Dean of the Jorge Tadeo Lozano University School of Advertising. 
Since early age, he showed interest in video production and animation. He graduated from Liceo Boston high school in 1991, and was immediately drafted into the National Army of Colombia, where he served as part of the Multinational Force and Observers in the Sinai Peninsula. In 1993 Schrader moved to Miami, Florida, to study journalism and mass communication at Florida International University, graduating magna cum laude in December, 1996.

Career 

Schrader's career launched in 1995, as a writer/producer for MTV Latin America, first producing popular shows like Ozono, Playa and Conexión, and later working in the on-air promos department. During his time at MTV he created memorable spots, some of them leading MTV Latin America into winning the Judge's Choice award at the 1999 PromaxBDA Latin America Awards.

After working in the on-air promotions department of several other cable channels airing in Latin America, like HTV and AXN, in 2004 he moved with his family to New York City to work as a Writer/Producer for VH1 promos and later as Creative Director for Vh1 digital. At Vh1 he created and directed campaigns for shows like Metal Month, Save The Music, Rock Honors and Hip-Hop Honors, the latter winning the Judge's Choice award at the 2006 PromaxBDA US Awards.

On 2007, Schrader participated, as part of N Pictures, in the 48 Hour Film Project held in Miami, writing and editing the short “A Monkton Family Christmas” which won Best Film of 2007 and went to represent Miami/Ft. Lauderdale at Filmapalooza 2008.

Schrader moved back to Colombia in 2009, where he took a job as Creative Director at G2, to later start his own video production/post-production company called Bualá, where he has directed award-winning campaigns and video content for local and international clients like MTV, Discovery Networks, Coca-Cola, adidas, Samsung, Huawei, McDonald's, Abbott Laboratories, One Young World, Caracol Televisión, Bavaria Brewery, Juan Valdez Café and many more.

Bualá, led by Schrader, won silver prize for animation at the 2015 World Media Festival, Hamburg, and their video mapping entry was chosen as finalist at the 2019 George Town festival in Penang, Malaysia.

Schrader has also directed music videos for Puerto rican band Circo and Colombian bands Pirañas and Árbol de Ojos.

DMK 

Schrader had been a Depeche Mode fan since he first heard them in 1987. In late 2010, as he was going through the separation from his first wife, he decided to recreate their 1985 classic “Shake the Disease” and invited his children Milah, then 7, and Korben, then 4, to participate. The video was followed by a second Depeche Mode cover in mid-2011, “Strangelove” and by a third in late-2011 “Everything Counts.” This video was suddenly picked up by news outlets and blogs around the world and it quickly went viral in late January, 2012, becoming an internet sensation.

In February 2012, the band adopted the name DMK, which stands for “Depeche Mode Kids” but also refers to the initials of the band members’ names.

They have been nominated for “Favorite Web Personality” at the 2015 Nickelodeon Kids' Choice Awards Colombia, featured in MTV Iggy's "10 Colombian bands on the rise" article, and in Ultimate Guitar´s list of 10 weirdest cover bands, and their remake of “Everything Counts” has been noted by The Atlantic as one of the most transformative cover songs  and by Electronic Beats as one of the ten best Depeche Mode covers ever made.

Since their viral success, DMK have been invited to perform in front of live audiences in Colombia, the United States, Spain, Poland and Germany.

On March 20, 2017, Schrader was chosen to take over Depeche Mode's Facebook page as part of the Takeover campaign, becoming one of Martin Gore's favorite entries, and on March 16, 2018, he finally met Depeche Mode at a meet-and-greet in Bogotá during their Global Spirit Tour.

As of July 2019, DMK have covered nine Depeche Mode songs: Shake the Disease, Strangelove, Everything Counts, Black Celebration, Enjoy the Silence, Just Can't Get Enough, But Not Tonight, The Meaning of Love and Personal Jesus. They have also released an original composition entitled "Pale Blue Dot" inspired on Carl Sagan's famous reflection on the photograph taken by the Voyager 1 space probe.

On November 21, 2019, Spirits in the Forest was released in theaters worldwide, featuring the stories of six life-long Depeche Mode fans, including Schrader and DMK.

On February 26, 2022, DMK released their last video, "Enjoy The Silence'22" and announced their decision of going into "permanent hiatus" through an online Zoom event hosted by the Depeche Mode Global Fan Club, and on December of the same year they released their only album, "Songs of Tiny Devotion: A Family Tribute to Depeche Mode 2010-2022," compiling all of the covers they created during the past 12 years plus an original song. The album was released on all major music streaming services including Spotify, Apple Music, iTunes, Amazon Music, and Pandora

Filmography

Short Film

Production 
MTV Latin America - Conexión MTV (1996-1999)
MTV Latin America – “Ozono” (1997-1999)
MTV Latin America – “Playa MTV” (1997-1999)
MTV Latin America – “Mastermix” (1997-1999)
MTV Latin America – “Rendez-Vous” (1998-1999)
Equinox Media – SoulCycle Season 2 (2020)

Advertisement 
MTV Latin America – “Noticias MTV” (1999)
MTV Latin America – “Animación MTV” (1999)
MTV Latin America – “Space Invaders Weekend Especial” (1999) - Winner, Best Design for On-Air Graphics, PromaxBDA Latin America 1999. Winner, Judges’ Choice Award, PromaxBDA Latin America 1999.
 MTV Latin America / Kodak– “¿Tienes memoria fotográfica?” (1999) - Winner, Best Audio for a Promo, PromaxBDA Latin America 1999.
MTV Latin America – “Molotov Weekend Especial” (1999)
MTV Latin America – “Sexxx Weekend” (1999) - Winner, Best Design for On-Air Logo, PromaxBDA Latin America 2000.
MTV Latin America / Telemundo – “MTV en Telemundo” (1999)
MTV Latin America – “Paparazzi” (1999)
MTV Latin America – “Obsesiones” (1999)
Loquesea.com – “Buscando a Gloria Trevi” (2001) - Winner, Most Effective Campaign, Effectiveness in Advertising Awards, 2002.
Loquesea.com – “Candidato Pantera” (2001)
Loquesea.com – “Somos Bytes” (2001)
MTV International – “Netbaby” (2001)
HTV – “Señor H” (2001)
HTV – “Artista del Mes” (2001)
AXN – “Gravity Games” (2002)
AXN – “31x31” (2002)
AXN – “World Stunt Awards” (2003)
Vh1 – “Sing a Song” (2004) - Special judge's mention, PromaxBDA US 2005.
Vh1 – “Gay Pride Week” (2005)
Vh1 – “Save The Music” (2005)
Vh1 – “Hip-Hop Honors” (2005) -Winner, Judges’ Choice Award, PromaxBDA US 2006.
Vh1 – “I Love the 70's Volume 2” (2006)
Vh1 – “Rock Honors” (2006)
Vh1 – “Music Good” (2006)
Vh1 – “Big in ‘06” (2006)
Vh1 – “Metal Month” (2006)
Shock Magazine – “Episodic Spots” (2011-2015)
Cromos – “Interesante, muy interesante” (2013)
McDonald's Costa Rica – “Free Coffee” (2013)
Premios Shock – “Tune-In” (2013-2018)
Nivea México – “Sweat” (2013)
Visa Inc. México – “Check-In” (2014)
Viacom International / International Labour Organization – “A Call to Action” (2014) - Winner, Silver. Best 3D Film, World Media Festival, 2015.
Visa Inc. México – “Visa Points” (2015)
Local Measure – “Infographic Spot” (2016)
Bayer México – “Canestén” (2016)
Caracol Televisión – “Reel 2016” (2016)
Locatel Colombia – “TV Spot” (2016)
Caracol Televisión – “Caracol V.I.P.” (2016)
William Lawson's Whiskey – “Success Story” (2017)
Jumbo Chocolate – “Jumbo Sessions” (2017)
Cámara de Comercio de Bogotá – “Ágora” (2017)
Coca-Cola Colombia – “A Christmas Message” (2017)
KPMG Colombia – “The Future” (2017)
Bavaria Brewery – “Corporate Video” (2018)
Plan International – “Corporate Video” (2018)
Shock / Amuse – “Guía del Músico Independiente” (2019)
Deezer - "Together We Make Magic" campaign (2019) 
Comedy Central – “Dark Humor” Tune-in spot (2021)
Comedy Central – “Patrice O'Neal: Killing is Easy” Tune-in spot (2021)
Screen Actors Guild Awards - Nominee montage (2021)
Univision – Upfront Sizzle Reel (2021)
Universal Music Group/Def Jam Records – Snoop Dogg's Announcement Video (2021) 
FX – "Archer on Hulu" Tune-in Spot (2021)
Univision – Sales video (2022)

3D Mapping Shows 
adidas / Millonarios F.C. – “New Uniform Event” (2016)
One Young World – “OYW Bogotá Inauguration Ceremony” (2017)
Schwarzkopf – “Beology” (2017)
Paribas – “Welcome to Colombia” (2017)
Comfacesar – “Convention Center Inauguration Ceremony” (2017)
Samsung – “Galaxy M20 Launch” (2017)
Nestlé / Pacific Alliance – “Inauguration Ceremony” (2018)
FIFA – “World Summit Bogotá” (2018)
Huawei – “Huawei P30 Launch” (2018)
George Town Festival, Malaysia – “The Colors of George Town” (2019) - Finalist, George Town 3D Mapping Festival, Malaysia, 2019.

Music Videos/Visual Shows 
El Beso – Circo (2002)
Shake The Disease – DMK (2010)
Strangelove – DMK (2011)
Everything Counts – DMK (2011)
Black Celebration – DMK (2012)
Enjoy The Silence – DMK (2012)
Just Can't Get Enough – DMK (2013)
But Not Tonight – DMK (2014)
Shock/Tigo Awards Visual Show - Caracol Television (2014)
Pale Blue Dot – DMK (2015)
Regular Visual Show – Árbol de Ojos (2015)
Todo Va A Estar Bien Lyric Video – Árbol de Ojos (2015)
Live in Poland– DMK (2016)
The Meaning Of Love – DMK (2017)
Soy Como Tú – Pirañas (2017)
Personal Jesus – DMK (2018)
Live in NYC – DMK (2019)
Precious – DMK (2020)
Enjoy The Silence '22 – DMK (2022)

Awards and recognition

PromaxBDA Awards Latin America

Best Audio for a Promo

Best Design for On-Air Graphics

Judge's Choice Award

Best Design for On-Air Logo

Effectiveness in Advertising Awards

Best Campaign for Digital Media

PromaxBDA Awards US

Special Jury Mention

Judge's Choice Award

48-Hour Film Project

Best Film

Best Film and Best Screenwriting

World Media Festival

Best 3D Film

Nickelodeon Kids’ Choice Awards

Favorite Web Personality

George Town Festival, Malaysia

3D Mapping

References

External links

dickenschrader.com Dicken Schrader's Portfolio Website
Tomomemitasha Dicken Schrader's YouTube Channel
LinkedIn Dicken Schrader's LinkedIn Profile
DMK DMK's Facebook band page
YouTube video DMK: "Everything Counts"
YouTube video DMK: "Strangelove"
YouTube video DMK: "Shake The Disease"
YouTube video DMK: "Black Celebration"
YouTube video DMK: "Enjoy The Silence"
YouTube video DMK: "Just Can't Get Enough"
YouTube video DMK: "But Not Tonight"
YouTube video DMK: "Pale Blue Dot"
YouTube video DMK Live in Poland
YouTube video DMK: "The Meaning Of Love"
YouTube video DMK: "Personal Jesus"
YouTube video DMK Live in NYC
YouTube video DMK: "Precious"
YouTube video DMK: "Enjoy The Silence '22"

1973 births
Living people
Colombian musicians
Colombian music video directors
Colombian Internet celebrities
People from Bogotá
Colombian people of German descent
Florida International University alumni